Cottévrard is a commune in the Seine-Maritime department in the Normandy region in northern France.

Geography
The A29 autoroute passes through the north of the commune.

Population

Places of interest
 The church of St.Nicolas, dating from the twelfth century.
 The Château de Grosmesnil.
 A sixteenth-century house.

See also
Communes of the Seine-Maritime department
John Alcock, pilot of the first non-stop Atlantic flight in 1919; died following a crash at Cottévrard six months later

References

Communes of Seine-Maritime